Shorncliffe can refer to:
 Shorncliffe, Queensland, a suburb of Brisbane in Australia
 Shorncliffe railway line, to the suburb
 Shorncliffe railway station, Brisbane, in the suburb
 Shorncliffe, Kent, a district of Folkestone, Kent, England, home to an army camp
 Shorncliffe Army Camp, a military establishment
 Shorncliffe Redoubt, a British Napoleonic earthwork fort in Kent